Eudonia zophochlaena is a moth in the family Crambidae. It was described by Edward Meyrick in 1923. It is endemic to New Zealand. It has been hypothesised that this species is a North Island endemic. The adults of this species are on the wing from December until February. The larvae of this species are leaf miners of the leather-leaf fern Pyrrosia eleagnifolia.

Taxonomy
This species was first described by Edward Meyrick in 1923 using a specimen collected by George Hudson in Takapuna, Auckland and named Scoparia zophochlaena. In 1928 George Hudson described and illustrated this species under that name. In 1988 John S. Dugdale discussed this species using the epithet zophoclaena and placed the species in the genus Eudonia. This placement was accepted in 2010 in the New Zealand Inventory of Biodiversity which listed the species under the name Eudonia zophochlaena. The male holotype is held at the Natural History Museum, London.

Description

Meyrick described the male adult of this species as follows:

Meyrick regarded this species as distinctive as it has large black patches on its forewings.

Distribution
This species is endemic to New Zealand. Brian Patrick hypothesised that this species is a North Island endemic as it has been observed in Auckland as well as in the Waikato, Hawkes Bay, Manawatū-Whanganui and Wellington regions.

Behaviour
Adults have been recorded on wing from December until February. Adults are active at night and are attracted to light.

Hosts

The larval host of this species is the leather-leaf fern Pyrrosia eleagnifolia. The larvae of this species travel from leaf to leaf via the silk tunnels they make, mining the leaves as they move. The larvae pupate within these tunnels surrounded by the silk, mined leaves, and frass.

References

Moths described in 1923
Eudonia
Moths of New Zealand
Endemic fauna of New Zealand
Taxa named by Edward Meyrick
Endemic moths of New Zealand